Younes Zerdouk (born 12 July 1973) is a former French footballer. He is currently manager of the Comoros.

Club career
Zerdouk began his career in the youth ranks at Auxerre and Saint-Doulchard, before joining Bourges in 1994. In 1998, Zerdouk signed for Romorantin, playing for the club for two seasons. In 2000, Zerdouk joined Angers. At Angers, Zerdouk made 29 Division 2 appearances as the club finished bottom of the 2000–01 French Division 2. Following a single season at Angers, Zerdouk re-signed for Romorantin, before moving back to Bourges in 2002. After nine goals in 65 league goals for Bourges, Zerouk signed for Trélissac, where he scored once in 31 games. Zerdouk finished his career with a three-season spell at Stade Briochin.

Managerial career
Following his playing career, Zerdouk moved into coaching. In 2015, Zerdouk was appointed manager of Belgian club Lierse. Zerdouk managed Lierse for six games, before being replaced by Eric Van Meir.

In October 2017, Zerdouk joined the Comoros' coaching staff, becoming Amir Abdou's assistant manager. On 7 March 2022, Zerdouk was appointed as Abdou's successor.

References

1966 births
Living people
People from Joigny
French footballers
Association football midfielders
French sportspeople of Moroccan descent
French Guiana international footballers
Bourges 18 players
SO Romorantin players
Angers SCO players
Trélissac FC players
Stade Briochin players
Lierse S.K. managers
Comoros national football team managers
French football managers
French expatriate football managers
Ligue 2 players
Championnat National players
Expatriate football managers in the Comoros
French expatriate sportspeople in the Comoros
Expatriate football managers in Belgium
French expatriate sportspeople in Belgium